The 1995 Vuelta a España was the 50th edition of the Vuelta a España, one of cycling's Grand Tours. The Vuelta began with a prologue individual time trial in Zaragoza on 2 September, and Stage 11 occurred on 13 September with a stage from Seville. The race finished in Madrid on 24 September.

Stage 11
13 September 1995 — Seville to Marbella,

Stage 12
14 September 1995 — Marbella to Sierra Nevada,

Stage 13
15 September 1995 — Olula del Río to Murcia,

Stage 14
16 September 1995 — Elche to Valencia,

Stage 15
17 September 1995 — Barcelona to Barcelona,

Rest day 2
18 September 1995

Stage 16
19 September 1995 — Tàrrega to Pla de Beret,

Stage 17
20 September 1995 — Salardu to Luz Ardiden,

Stage 18
21 September 1995 — Luz-Saint-Sauveur to Sabiñánigo,

Stage 19
22 September 1995 — Sabiñánigo to Calatayud,

Stage 20
23 September 1995 — Alcalá de Henares to Alcalá de Henares,  (ITT)

Stage 21
24 September 1995 — Alcalá de Henares to Madrid,

References

11
1995,11